The Montreal and Bytown Railway Company was a Canadian railway company. Chartered in August 1853, the company built a line between Montreal and Bytown, which is now known as Ottawa.  It was declared insolvent in 1858 and was acquired by the Carillon and Grenville Railway Company in 1859.

References

Defunct Quebec railways
Railway companies established in 1853
Railway companies disestablished in 1859